Lyuben Karastoyanov (born 1904, date of death unknown) was a Bulgarian middle-distance runner. He competed in the men's 1500 metres at the 1924 Summer Olympics.

References

External links
 

1904 births
Year of death missing
Athletes (track and field) at the 1924 Summer Olympics
Bulgarian male middle-distance runners
Olympic athletes of Bulgaria
Place of birth missing